Dubianaclia amplificata is a moth of the subfamily Arctiinae. It was described by Saalmüller in 1880. It is found in Madagascar.

References

Arctiinae